The following teams and players took part in the men's volleyball tournament at the 1984 Summer Olympics, in Los Angeles.

Argentina
The following volleyball players represented Argentina:
 Alcides Cuminetti
 Alejandro Diz
 Carlos Wagenpfeil
 Daniel Castellani
 Esteban Martínez
 Hugo Conte
 Jon Emili Uriarte
 Leonardo Wiernes
 Raúl Quiroga
 Waldo Kantor

Brazil
The following volleyball players represented Brazil:
 Bernardinho
 Xandó
 Badalhoca
 Montanaro
 Rui
 Renan
 William (c)
 Amauri
 Marcus Vinícius
 Domingos Maracanã
 Bernard
 Fernandão

Canada
The following volleyball players represented Canada:
 Alex Ketrzynski
 Allan Coulter
 Dave Jones
 Don Saxton
 Garth Pischke
 Glenn Hoag
 John Barrett
 Paul Gratton
 Randy Wagner
 Rick Bacon
 Terry Danyluk
 Tom Jones

China
The following volleyball players represented China:
 Cao Ping
 Liu Changcheng
 Shen Keqin
 Song Jinwei
 Xiao Qingsong
 Yang Liqun
 Yan Jianming
 Yu Juemin
 Ju Jixin
 Zhang Yousheng
 Zhao Feng
 Zuo Yue

Egypt
The following volleyball players represented Egypt:
 Mohamed Abdel Hamed
 Khaled Abdel Rahman
 Mahmoud Abou Elelaa
 Gaber Mooti Abou Zeid
 Essam Meawad
 Ahmed Abdel Aziz El-Askalani
 Ahmed El-Shamouty
 Shaban Khalifa
 Abdel Hamid El-Wassimy
 Ehab Mohamed
 Hisham Radwan
 Essam Ramadan

Italy
The following volleyball players represented Italy:
 Marco Negri
 Pier Paolo Lucchetta
 Giancarlo Dametto
 Franco Bertoli
 Francesco Dall'Olio
 Piero Rebaudengo
 Giovanni Errichiello
 Guido De Luigi
 Fabio Vullo
 Giovanni Lanfranco
 Paolo Vecchi
 Andrea Lucchetta

Japan
The following volleyball players represented Japan:
 Akihiro Iwashima
 Eizaburo Mitsuhashi
 Hiroaki Okuno
 Kazuya Mitake
 Kimio Sugimoto
 Koshi Sobu
 Minoru Iwata
 Shuji Yamada
 Shunichi Kawai
 Yasushi Furukawa
 Mikiyasu Tanaka
 Eiji Shimomura

South Korea
The following volleyball players represented South Korea:
 Jang Yun-chang
 Jeong Ui-tak
 Gang Du-tae
 Gang Man-su
 Kim Ho-cheol
 Lee Beom-ju
 Lee Jong-kyung
 Lee Yong-seon
 Mun Yong-gwan
 No Jin-su
 Yang Jin-ung
 Yu Jung-tak

Tunisia
The following volleyball players represented Tunisia:
 Abdel Aziz Ben Abdallah
 Adel Khechini
 Chebbi Mbarek
 Faycal Laridhi
 Msaddak Lahmar
 Mohamed Sarsar
 Mounir Barek
 Rashid Bousarsar
 Razi Mhiri
 Slim Mehrizi
 Walid Boulahya
 Yassine Mezlini

United States
The following volleyball players represented the United States:
 Dusty Dvorak
 Dave Saunders
 Steve Salmons
 Paul Sunderland
 Rich Duwelius
 Steve Timmons
 Craig Buck
 Marc Waldie
 Chris Marlowe (c)
 Aldis Berzins
 Pat Powers
 Karch Kiraly

References

1984